"Chapter Seven: Loud, Fast, and Keep Going" is the seventh episode in the first season of the American dark comedy television series Barry. The episode was directed by series co-creator Alec Berg and written by Liz Sarnoff, and originally aired on HBO on May 6, 2018. In the episode, Barry (Bill Hader) deals with the aftermath of the botched bum-rush and begins to struggle with the morality of his actions.

The episode received acclaim from critics, particularly for Hader's performance. At the 70th Primetime Emmy Awards, Hader won the Outstanding Lead Actor in a Comedy Series for his performance in the episode, while Sarnoff was nominated for Outstanding Writing for a Comedy Series.

Plot
In the aftermath of the botched bum-rush, Taylor and Vaughn are dead, and Barry (Bill Hader) and Chris (Chris Marquette) have fled the scene. A Bolivian mob henchman finds Barry out in the desert and prepares to execute him before being shot dead by Chris from behind. The Bolivian mafia leader, Cristobal Sifuentes (Michael Irby), phones Goran (Glenn Fleshler), informing him about the two dead soldiers and tells him that he would've gladly shared the stash house if Goran had asked, but since his people were killed, they are now at war. Assuming one of the dead was Barry, NoHo Hank (Anthony Carrigan) tells Fuches (Stephen Root) that Barry is dead, causing Fuches to break down. Meanwhile, the police listen in on the call between Sifuentes and Goran, and Detective Moss (Paula Newsome) pinpoints Barry to be the prime suspect of Ryan Madison's murder due to his background as a Marine. However, police soon find a copy of Ryan's book (that he gave to Barry) at Taylor's apartment, leading Taylor to become their main suspect.

Barry arrives at the community center and is informed by Sally (Sarah Goldberg) that the police found money in the theater and that they suspect Ryan is involved with the Chechen mafia. At rehearsal, Barry struggles to deliver his one line and is berated by Sally and Gene (Henry Winkler), the latter suspecting that Barry is on drugs. Barry later meets up with Chris in a remote location, who remains traumatized by the earlier events. Chris tells Barry that to clear his conscience, he will go to the authorities and confess. In response, Barry kills Chris and stages the scene as a suicide before fleeing.

Barry returns to the community center and Sally tells him that a talent agent that she invited is in the audience, and begs him to give her something to work with to impress the agent. However, as Barry waits in the wings, he becomes overwhelmed with the guilt of killing Chris and suffers an emotional breakdown. He then goes on stage and tearfully delivers his one line; Sally proceeds to harness Barry's delivery to give an outstanding performance. After the show, Gene congratulates and praises Barry backstage, but he remains overwhelmed with guilt, punching a glass frame in response. Back in the theater, Sally tells Barry that the agent was impressed by her performance, and thanks Barry for helping her. After Sally leaves, Barry stands alone on the stage, staring into the empty audience.

Cast

Main 
 Bill Hader as Barry Berkman/Barry Block
 Stephen Root as Monroe Fuches
 Sarah Goldberg as Sally Reed
 Glenn Fleshler as Goran Pazar
 Anthony Carrigan as NoHo Hank
 Henry Winkler as Gene Cousineau

Guest Starring 
 Paula Newsome as Detective Janice Moss
 Chris Marquette as Chris Lucado
 John Pirrucello as Detective John Loach
 Darrell Britt-Gibson as Jermaine Jefrint
 D'Arcy Carden as Natalie Greer
 Andy Carey as Eric
 Karen David as Sharon Lucado
 Rightor Doyle as Nick Nicholby
 Alejandro Furth as Antonio Manuel
 Kirby Howell-Baptiste as Sasha Smith
 Michael Irby as Cristobal Sifuentes
 Dale Pavinski as Taylor Garrett

Reception
The episode received critical acclaim, with Hader's performance receiving particular praise. Vikram Murthi of The A.V. Club gave the episode an A rating and said it "makes a bold turn that makes the whole show suddenly click." Nick Harley, in a review for Den of Geek, praised the episode and said "The way Hader and Co. are able to constantly surprise and effortlessly toggle back and forth between jokes and drama is completely spellbinding." Writing for The Ringer, Alison Herman called Hader's performance "flat-out extraordinary" and said the episode did not "shy away from confronting their viewers with the full extent of Barry's corruption."

At the 70th Primetime Emmy Awards, Hader was awarded the Outstanding Lead Actor in a Comedy Series for his performance while Liz Sarnoff was nominated for Outstanding Writing for a Comedy Series.

References

External links
 "Chapter Seven: Loud, Fast, and Keep Going" at HBO
 

Barry (TV series) episodes
2018 American television episodes